Orolik is a village in the Stari Jankovci municipality, Vukovar-Syrmia County, in eastern Croatia. The village is connected with the rest of the country by the D46 state road connecting it with the town of Vinkovci and continuing into Serbia as the State Road 120 to the nearest town of Šid, D57 road and by the M105 railway.

History
One archaeological site in Orolik dating back to the Iron Age in Europe period was excavated in the 1970s and 1980s as a part of rescue excavations in eastern Croatia. This archaeological site was a settlement of the late La Tène culture settlement network of the Scordisci in the area of Vinkovci. First excavations of Scordisci sites began in late 19th century during the time of Austro-Hungarian Empire.

Orolik was established in the 16th century during the Ottoman rule in Hungary. During this  period the most of the population were Catholic Croats who remained in the village after the Treaty of Karlowitz. In 1715 the  local church register records that there were 19 inhabited houses  total in the entire village.  During the next decade Hofkammer in Vienna settled 20 families of Eastern Orthodox Vlachs or Serbs in the village. In 1866 there was 205 Orthodox and 106 Roman Catholic families in the village.

According to the 1890 census, Orolik had 936 inhabitants, of which 521 were Roman Catholics, 384 Orthodox, 20 Jews, 5 Lutherans, 5 Nazarenes and 1 Greek Catholic.

See also 
Orolik railway station
Church of St. Peter and Paul, Orolik

References

External links
Aerial view of the village on the Stari Jankovci Municipality You-Tube Page

Populated places in Vukovar-Syrmia County
Populated places in Syrmia
Archaeological sites in Croatia
La Tène culture